Rohit Varma is an Indian-American ophthalmologist and professor of ophthalmology and preventive medicine. In 2014, he was named director of the USC Eye Institute and chairman of the Department of Ophthalmology for Keck School of Medicine of USC. In March 2016, Varma was named the interim dean of the Keck School of Medicine, and in November was named dean. In October 2017, USC announced that he stepped down as dean. In October 2018, Varma became the founding director of the Southern California Eyecare and Vision Research Institute.

Varma has studied eye diseases in minority populations and examined biological, genetic and lifestyle factors related to the risk of developing eye diseases, as well as their prevalence.

Education 

Varma earned his medical degree from the University of Delhi and a Master of Public Health from the Johns Hopkins School of Public Health. He completed an internal medicine internship at Union Memorial Hospital in Baltimore, a residency at the Wilmer Ophthalmological Institute at Johns Hopkins Hospital, and a glaucoma fellowship at the Wills Eye Hospital in Philadelphia.

Career 
In September 2012, Varma was appointed chair of the Department of Ophthalmology and Visual Sciences and associate dean for strategic planning at the University of Illinois College of Medicine. He spent two years at the Illinois Eye and Ear Infirmary and then returned to Keck School of Medicine of USC as chair of the Department of Ophthalmology and director of the USC Eye Institute. In 2014, he helped develop the Xen implant. The collagen-derived gelatin stent was a development on traditional glaucoma surgery, as it is said to be less invasive.

In February 2016, he was elected president of the clinical chairs of the Keck School of Medicine, succeeding John Niparko. In March 2016, Varma was named interim dean of the Keck School of Medicine of USC when Carmen Puliafito, who had been dean since 2007, resigned after reports were published regarding his use of methamphetamine. In November 2016, Varma was named dean. While dean, Varma launched an international expansion project. The Keck School obtained more than $140 million in National Institutes of Health grants during his tenure.

In October 2017 Varma stepped down as dean to join the faculty at USC after sexual harassment claims against him were uncovered. In July 2018, it was announced that Varma had joined the Board of Directors at Illusio, a medical software company bringing augmented reality technology into plastic surgery. With his experience working within academia and medicine, Varma will help Illusio expand to academic medical centers and community hospitals.

In October 2018, the Hollywood Presbyterian Medical Center announced Varma as the founding director of the Southern California Eyecare and Vision Research Institute (SCEVRI).

Research 
Varma has studied eye diseases in minority populations and examined biological, genetic and lifestyle factors related to the risk of developing eye diseases. In 2000, Varma was part of the Los Angeles Latino Eye Study at the Doheny Eye Institute, with the National Eye Institute. In 2006, Varma published a paper in the American Journal of Ophthalmology, discussing diabetic retinopathy.

Varma's primary research has focused on epidemiologic studies of eye disease in children and aging populations. He was the principal investigator in the Los Angeles Latino Eye Study, the African-American Eye Disease Study, the Chinese-American Eye Study, and the Multi-Ethnic Pediatric Eye Diseases Study. MEPEDS is the largest study of childhood eye diseases ever undertaken in the U.S. In January 2016, the study confirmed that the incidence of childhood myopia among American children has more than doubled over the last 50 years. The findings echo a trend among adults and children in Asia, where 90% or more of the population have been diagnosed with myopia, up from 10% to 20% 60 years ago.

He has studied also changes in the optic nerve in glaucoma, and has helped develop imaging techniques that aid in the early diagnosis of glaucomatous optic nerve damage.

Publications 
Varma co-wrote two ophthalmic books: Essentials of Eye Care: The Johns Hopkins Wilmer Handbook; and The Optic Nerve in Glaucoma. Varma co-edited the book Advanced Glaucoma Surgery, published by Springer International Publishing in its Essentials in Ophthalmology series.

Varma has additionally published many articles in journals such as Glaucoma Today and Ophthalmology Times.

References

External links 
 Official webpage at Keck Medicine of USC

American ophthalmologists
Living people
Year of birth missing (living people)
Delhi University alumni
Johns Hopkins University alumni
Keck School of Medicine of USC faculty